Darino is a surname. Notable people with the surname include:

 Eduardo Darino (born 1944), Uruguayan film producer, director, animator, and cartoonist
 Siro Darino (born 1976), Argentine footballer

See also
 Darini
 Marino (name)